Stefania Benedetti (born 6 September 1969) is a former Italian female long-distance runner who competed at individual senior level at the IAAF World Half Marathon Championships.

References

External links
 

1969 births
Living people
Italian female long-distance runners
Sportspeople from Bergamo
People from Alzano Lombardo
Italian female marathon runners
Sportspeople from the Province of Bergamo
20th-century Italian women
21st-century Italian women